Terezino can refer to:
 Terezino Polje, a village in Croatia,
 Terezyne (Terezino), an urban-type settlement in Kyiv Oblast of Ukraine